James Magee may refer to:
 James Magee (sportsman, born 1872) (1872–1949), Irish cricketer and rugby union player
 James Magee (cricketer, born 1995), Irish cricketer
 James Magee (sea captain) (1750–1801), American sea captain and businessman
 James Magee (artist), American artist
 James McDevitt Magee (1877–1949), American politician
 Jimmy Magee (1935–2017), Irish sports broadcaster
 James C. Magee (1883–1975), American medical officer

See also
James McGee (disambiguation)
James McGhee (disambiguation)